WJIZ-FM (96.3 FM) is a radio station broadcasting an urban contemporary format. Licensed to Albany, Georgia, United States, the station is currently owned by iHeartMedia and features programming from Westwood One.  Its studios are on Westover Boulevard in Albany, and the transmitter is located east of Albany.

References

External links

JIZ
Radio stations established in 1962
Urban contemporary radio stations in the United States
IHeartMedia radio stations
1962 establishments in Georgia (U.S. state)